Somatidia lineifera is a species of beetle in the family Cerambycidae. It was described by Broun in 1909.

References

lineifera
Beetles described in 1909